Harttia fowleri is a species of armored catfish that inhabits the Oyapock River basin of Brazil and French Guiana.  C. fowleri is a poorly known species that was caught in rapids along with Metaloricaria paucidens.  This species grows to a length of  SL.

The fish is named in honor of ichthyologist Henry Weed Fowler (1878-1965), of the Academy of Natural Sciences of Philadelphia.

References 

fowleri
Fish of South America
Fish of Brazil
Fish of French Guiana
Taxa named by Jacques Pellegrin
Fish described in 1908